Puerto Rico is the capital city of Libertador General San Martín, in the Misiones Province of Argentina.

It is located along the Paraná River. It limits to the south with the city of Capioví, at east and north with the Garuhapé and to the east west with Paraguay.

Strategically located along Route 12, it is half way between the Iguazu Falls and the province's capital Posadas.

With almost 12.500 hectares, the city has a population of around 20.000 people, mainly composed of European immigrants.

Regional languages
Riograndenser Hunsrückisch is a German dialect with an almost two centuries history originated in the neighboring state of Rio Grande do Sul, Brazil, and spoken as a minority language in this region of Misiones since its pioneer days.

References 

Populated places in Misiones Province
Populated places established in 1919
German-Argentine culture